The 2010–11 Texas Brahmas season was the 10th season of the Central Hockey League franchise in North Richland Hills, Texas.

Regular season

Conference standings

Awards and records

Awards

Milestones

Transactions
The Brahmas have been involved in the following transactions during the 2010–11 season.

Trades

Roster

See also
 2010–11 CHL season

References

External links
 2010–11 Texas Brahmas season at Pointstreak

T
T